Stichting Alde Fryske Tsjerken (English: Old Frisian Churches Foundation) is a foundation which aims to preserve church buildings in Friesland, the Netherlands.

The foundation owns 38 churches as for 2010.
It was established in 1970 and is based in Leeuwarden, the capital of the province. All churches in the care of the foundation are Rijksmonuments, which is a condition for the foundation for newly acquired churches.
The churches are maintained with subsidy from the Rijksdienst voor het Cultureel Erfgoed, the province Friesland, municipalities, several culturefunds and public gifts.

Churches

References

Rijksmonuments in Friesland